The 24th Separate Guards Special Forces Brigade (24-й отдельной бригады специального назначения) is a special forces (spetsnaz) brigade of the Armed Forces of the Russian Federation.

Structure 

 Brigade HQ
 Signals Company
 Special Weapons Company
 Logistics Unit
 281st Special Purpose Detachment
 297th Special Purpose Detachment
 641th Special Purpose Detachment

History 
The brigade was established on 1 November 1977, in the Transbaikalia military region on the basis of the 806th separate special purpose company. In 2002, it was transferred to Buryatia, in 2009 to the Irkutsk region, and in 2012 to Novosibirsk. Initially, only a command team and the 1st Battalion were deployed. In 1980, the 2nd battalion was deployed.

Afghanistan 
In 1984, the 281st separate special forces unit was formed on the basis of the 24th obrSpN and deployed to Afghanistan.

Chechnya 
The 281st separate special forces unit took part in combat operations in Chechnya in 1994-1996.

North Caucasus 
The brigade formed a combined unit that conducted reconnaissance and combat operations in the North Caucasus from 5 September to 26 December 2000. After a six-month deployment to the North Caucasus, the detachment (1st b-n) returned to the place of permanent deployment in December 2006.  As of October 2012, the combined battalion was deployed to Ingushetia.

2022 Russian invasion of Ukraine 
This brigade participated in the invasion of Ukraine in 2022. On 31 May, Putin granted Guard status to the GRU/GU's 24th Spetsnaz Brigade. The brigade reportedly played a key role in the fighting in Lyman. Confirmed casualties are listed below, but there is evidence that the unit lost more than 70 men.

Confirmed losses 

 32-year-old Major Sergey Kashansky. He was reportedly serving in a unit in Novosibirsk, likely either the GRU/GU's 24th Spetsnaz Brigade or 41st Combined Arms Army.
 Andrey Baranov, a contract soldier with the GRU/GU's 24th Spetsnaz Brigade based in Novosibirsk.
 28-year-old Semyon Nesterenko previously served with the GRU/GU's 3rd Spetsnaz Brigade and then likely with the 24th Spetsnaz Brigade. He took part in the annexation of Crimea.
 Alexander Savelyev, a contract serviceman with the GRU/GU's 24th Spetsnaz Brigade, was killed in Ukraine on 5 March reportedly by a mine.
 Praporshchik Kara Boydoev was killed in Ukraine on 24 March. He previously served with the 42nd Naval Reconnaissance Point (OMRP) naval spetsnaz, and then with the GRU/GU's 24th Spetsnaz Brigade after graduating RVVDKU.
 Sergeant Alexander Zhovner served with the GRU/GU's 24th Spetsnaz Brigade. He was previously deployed to Syria.
 Vasily Solak served with the GRU/GU's 24th Spetsnaz Brigade. He was killed in Ukraine on 8 May.
 Captain Dmitry Pak was a graduate of the Novosibirsk Higher Military Command School and served in a Spetsnaz unit. He was killed in Ukraine on 6 May. He took part in the annexation of Crimea and was deployed to Syria and Libya. Pak is the second Russian Spetsnaz soldier killed in Ukraine, having reportedly previously served in Libya.
 Captain Fyodor Panov served with the GRU/GU's 24th Spetsnaz Brigade.
 Danil Dikiy served with the GRU/GU's 24th Spetsnaz Brigade. He was killed on 30 April in Yampil, Donetsk Oblast reportedly along with 7 other soldiers.
 Yefreytor Evgeny Donin served with the GRU/GU's 24th Spetsnaz Brigade as a conscript and then signed a contract to serve in the 74th Motorized Rifle Brigade's reconnaissance battalion. He was killed in Ukraine on 11 August.
 Alexey Siksay served with the GRU/GU's 24th Spetsnaz Brigade. He was killed in Ukraine on 19 July near Lysychansk.
 Junior Sergeant Alexander Medvedev of the GRU/GU's 24th Spetsnaz Brigade was killed in Ukraine on 13 August.
 Roman Zhizhemsky killed on 11 August. InformNapalm's known KIA count for the 24th Spetsnaz Brigade is now 16
 Maxim Vinogradov served with the GRU/GU's 24th Spetsnaz Brigade. He previously deployed to Syria and was killed in Ukraine on 26 June.
 Captain Kevish Vyacheslav Eduardovich was killed in Ukraine on 16 September.

See also 

 Spetsnaz
 Special Operations Forces (Russia)

References 

Spetsnaz brigades of Russia
Spetsnaz brigades of the Soviet Union
Military units and formations established in 1976